The 16th Goya Awards was an awards ceremony that took place at the Palacio Municipal de Congresos in Madrid, Spain on 2 February 2002.

The Others won the award for Best Film.

Winners and nominees

Major award nominees

Other award nominees

Honorary Goya
 Juan Antonio Bardem

References

16
2001 film awards
2001 in Spanish cinema
2002 in Madrid